SS Manhattan was a  luxury ocean liner of the United States Lines, named after the Manhattan borough of New York City. In 1942 she caught fire and was rebuilt as a troop ship. Manhattan never saw commercial service again.

Construction
When they were built, Manhattan and her sister ship , also built by New York Shipbuilding Corporation, were the largest liners ever built in the United States, and Manhattan was the first large liner built in the US since 1905. Manhattan and Washington were two of the few pure liners built by New York Shipbuilding, which had previously built a large number of cargo liners. United States Lines signed contracts in 1931 for the two ships at a cost of about $21 million (equivalent to $ million in ) each. This was considered an extreme cost in the Depression, and a gamble.

The ship's keel was laid as New York Shipbuilding's hull 405 on 6 December 1930 with launch on 5 December 1931 and delivery to the owners on 27 July 1932. Mrs. Theodore Roosevelt, Sr., christened the ship with speakers representing shipping lines joining interest into the new United States Lines. Those lines were International Merchantile Marine Company, Roosevelt Lines, and the Dollar Lines.

Eleven water tight bulkheads created twelve water tight compartments. In 1934 these were superseded by call sign WIEA. She carried a crew of 481.

Manhattan was designed to carry 1,239 passengers in 582 cabin, 461 tourist, and 196 third class rooms. The main cabin class public rooms, including a grand salon, library, palm court, verandah café, and open recreation or dance space aft, were on the promenade deck. Cabin class state rooms were forward on A deck with tourist class game space aft. B deck had tourist class public rooms. Cabin class entrance foyer, state rooms, and dining were forward on C deck with tourist class entrance foyer, state rooms, and dining aft. Third class lounge and an open promenade were aft of the tourist class spaces on C deck. D deck contained some cabin class state rooms, a swimming pool, and gymnasium, with tourist class state rooms aft. Crew quarters and a mess hall/station were on E deck with the third class dining room and state rooms aft.

Prior to commercial passenger operation, the ship made a special twenty-four-hour cruise off New York with over seven hundred passenger agents representing companies and offices from across the nation. The guests were entertained with the full services passengers could expect, including dancing and viewing a new movie in the ship's theater.

Commercial career

Beginning in August 1932 Manhattan operated the New York – Hamburg route, one she would continue to serve with only one short break until December 1939, when President Roosevelt invoked the Neutrality Act against Germany. In July 1936, the ship carried the US Olympic team to the 1936 Summer Olympics in Berlin. In 1938 she carried some of the Kennedy family to the UK when Joseph P. Kennedy Sr. was appointed as ambassador.

Travel writer Douglas Ward claims in his book Berlitz Guide to Cruising that the alcoholic cocktail "Manhattan" was named after the ship; however, there is little evidence for confirmation. A one-way trip, off-season, in the cheapest room available cost roughly $1,800 USD in 2019.

Kindertransport
On 22 March 1939 passengers embarking on Manhattan in Hamburg included 88 unaccompanied children who were Jewish refugees from Nazi Germany. The 24-hour journey from Hamburg to Southampton was part of the Kindertransport, as it later came to be known, between December 1938 and the outbreak of war in September 1939.

70% of the children (62 individuals) had been born in Berlin.

Early WWII
In October 1939 Manhattan carried passengers, mostly Americans, from England (then at war with Germany) to New York. On 4 February 1940, the ship was seized by British forces in Gibraltar and released after 390 sacks of mail bound for Germany were confiscated. From January 1940 until Italy's entry into World War II in June 1940 she sailed between New York and Genoa. On 6 March 1941, the commander of the marine inspection bureau suspended the master and first officer after finding them guilty of negligence in the grounding. The master received an eight-month suspension while the first officer was suspended for one month.

Troopship
 
On 14 June 1941 Manhattan was delivered to the War Shipping Administration (WSA) and was assigned to the US Navy for operation under bareboat charter. The ship was subsequently commissioned as the troopship USS Wakefield on 15 June 1941. Assigned a Coast Guard crew under Commander Wilfrid N. Derby, she became the largest vessel ever operated by the Coast Guard. 

The Manhattan never re-entered commercial service. On 3 September 1942, while en route from Clyde to New York as part of convoy TA-18, a fire broke out aboard. Taken in tow by the Canadian Salvage vessel Foundation Franklin, the Wakefield reached Halifax five days later, still burning. By the time the last flames were extinguished, her hull was effectively gutted. Paid off by the Navy, she was towed to Boston Navy Yard and rebuilt to troopship specifications. She completed her final voyage and commenced inactivation at Bayonne, N.J., in May 1946, considered unsuitable for conversion for commercial service. In 1965, she was sold for scrap.

See also

 Short Documentary – The Story Of A Transport: USS Wakefield (1944)

References

Bibliography
 Gibbs, CR Vernon (1957). Passenger Liners of the Western Ocean (2nd ed). London: Staples Press Limited. LCCN 57001880
 New York Shipbuilding Corporation (1948). 50 Years: New York Shipbuilding Corporation. Camden:house publication
 Newell, Gordon (1963). Ocean Liners of the 20th Century (1st ed.). Seattle: Superior Publishing Company. LCCN 63-18494

External links
 illustrated description of these ships

Ocean liners
1931 ships
Ships built by New York Shipbuilding Corporation
Maritime incidents in January 1941